Gastronationalism or culinary nationalism is the use of food and its history, production, control, preparation and consumption as a way of promoting nationalism and national identity. It may involve arguments between two or more regions or countries about whether a particular dish or preparation is claimed by one of those regions or countries and has been appropriated or co-opted by the others.

Origins 
Atsuko Ichijo and Ronald Ranta have called food "fundamentally political" and "one of the essential commodities with which political powers at various levels are concerned". Food historian Michelle T. King suggests that cuisine is a natural focus for studies of nationalism, pointing out dozens of such treatments over the first decades of the 21st century. She also argues Asia's culinary nationalism has been particularly intense. Examples of gastronationalism include efforts by state bodies, nongovernmental bodies, businesses and business groups, and individuals. 

New York University professor Fabio Parasecoli has defined food as an expression of identity. Conflict between two or more regions or countries about whether a particular dish or preparation is claimed by one of those regions or countries and has been appropriated or co-opted by the others is not uncommon, especially in areas where there has been violent conflict. Dishes affected by these culinary wars tend to be those with "a clearly symbolic ethnic significance". They also tend to be dishes that "represent territorial aspirations" and can be developed and prepared only by settled – and therefore indigenous – peoples. Lavash and harissa are wheat-based, therefore cannot have been developed by nomads but only by an agricultural society. Many of the debates center around the idea that a "settled" society – that is, an agricultural rather than nomadic one – is somehow superior, and that claiming a dish only achievable in an agricultural society helps prove the area was agricultural at a certain point. This idea was official policy in the Soviet Union. According to OpenDemocracy, "evidence of ancient agricultural development is cherished by nationalists on both sides."

Mary Douglas said "national food cultures become a blinding fetish which, if disregarded, may be as dangerous as an explosion”.

In 2006 researcher Liora Gvion argued that cuisines of poverty – typically, traditional foods – "reveal the inter-connection between the culinary discourse and the political one" and that the issue was tied up with those of access to land and national identity.

Sociologist Michaela DeSoucey in 2010 described the concept of gastronationalism as the use of food and its history, production, control, and consumption as a way of promoting nationalism. According to DeSoucey, gastronationalism uses food to promote a sense of national identity and affects how members of the national community develop "national sentiments and taste preferences for certain foods." She argues that the issues go beyond simple nationalism and involve livelihoods and a "struggle for markets" as the identification of a certain food with a certain area means the ability to sell a food product is affected for those inside or outside the area. She also points out that such arguments are often not intended to reach agreement but instead to raise awareness of the food product and generate interest in obtaining it.

In 2013 Al Jazeera noted that gastronationalism had been an ongoing issue in Armenia, Azerbaijan, and Georgia as each country "vie[d] for the recognition of certain dishes as their own" and was causing tension among neighboring countries with already-troubled relationships.

In 2020 an article published by the Cambridge University Press found that while the concept of gastronationalism had not been fully developed in academia, the scholarship was developing quickly.

National cuisine 
Food historian King differentiates between gastronationalism, or culinary nationalism, and national cuisine, saying that culinary nationalism "suggests a dynamic process of creation and contestation" while national cuisine "calls to mind a specific and static product".

Governmental and non-governmental bodies

Codex Alimentarius Commission 
The Codex Alimentarius Commission is a project of the Food and Agriculture Organization and the World Health Organization which creates advice regarding food handling, labeling, and ethical standards, including those around marketing a food as originating in a certain place.

Intangible Cultural Heritage designation 
In some cases United Nations Educational, Scientific and Cultural Organization (UNESCO) has made statements favoring one side or the other of such an argument, sometimes after being asked to name a food to a UNESCO Intangible Cultural Heritage list for a country, which has increased passions on either side. In 1972 UNESCO adopted the Convention Concerning the Protection of the World Cultural and Natural Heritage or World Heritage Convention.

Protected Geographical Status 
In Europe, mandatory origin labeling is "one of the most prickly topics" in European Union (EU) policy discussions. In December 2019 France, Greece, Italy, Portugal and Spain asked the EU to strengthen food origin labeling; Politico called the request a "bombshell", as it weakens the idea of a single market. The Protected Geographical Status as of 2016 had been applied to over a thousand food items.

Examples 
Azerbaijan's National Culinary Centre, a non-governmental organization (NGO) publishes information discussing Azerbaijan’s national cuisine and accusing Armenian cuisine of imitating Azerbaijan. The NGO's CEO said, "“Since 1989, the issue of Armenian pretentions towards Azerbaijan’s culinary traditions has been discussed at the highest level, by specialists and academics, many times. Every pan-Turkish, Islamic dish, including those from Azerbaijan, is claimed as Armenian – they are trying to prove that an Armenian culinary tradition exists." Armenia's Society for the Preservation and Development of Armenian Culinary Traditions, an academic body, has discussed the Armenian culinary tradition.

During the hummus wars, multiple corporations and business groups became involved as part of their marketing campaigns.

Notable examples

Borscht 
Borscht is believed to have originated in Kievan Rus' and specifically in the area of modern-day Ukraine, but according to historian Alison K. Smith, the dish's "Ukrainian origins have been largely obscured" as it became ubiquitous in Russian cuisine. 

The dish was described in Sergei Drukovtsov's Cooking Notes (1779), but is believed to have entered popular Russian cuisine from the popular 1939 Soviet cookbook Book of Tasty and Healthy Food that included dishes from various cuisines of the USSR. In 2019, the official Twitter account of Ministry of Foreign Affairs of the Russian Federation referred to borscht as "one of Russia’s most famous & beloved #dishes & a symbol of traditional cuisine" in one of their tweets, sparking outrage in Ukraine, where it was widely seen as an attempt at cultural appropriation.

In response, Ukraine applied for the inclusion of borscht in the UNESCO Intangible Cultural Heritage List and launched a five-year culinary diplomacy strategy dubbed 'borscht diplomacy' where borscht plays a central role.

During the 2022 Russian invasion of Ukraine, Russia’s Foreign Ministry's spokesperson Maria Zakharova said the fact that the Ukrainians "didn’t want to share borscht" was an example of alleged "xenophobia, Nazism, extremism in all forms" that led to the invasion.

Chinese cuisine 
Taiwan has presented Taiwanese cuisine as the only remnant of traditional Chinese culture and cuisine, which the Nationalist Party argued had "been destroyed on the Chinese Mainland after the Communist takeover". On the other hand, some Taiwanese object to the politically fraught inclusion of Taiwanese cuisine under the banner of regional Chinese cuisine and argue that it is "inaccurate".

In 2011, the Michelin Green Guide to Taiwan attributed the origins of minced pork rice to Shandong. This led to a fierce debate in Taiwan with many people insisting that minced pork rice originated in Taiwan, while others viewed it as a Shandong dish that simply caught on in Taiwan.

Shanghainese people have criticized the Taiwanese restaurant chain Din Tai Fung of misrepresenting the xiao long bao as a Taiwanese dish.

In October 2020, a Japanese bakery c'est très fou launched the product "Taiwanese pineapple bun", which received criticism from Hong Kongers for suggesting the product originated in Taiwan.

Dolma 
Dolma or tolma is claimed by both Armenia and Azerbaijan. Armenia holds an annual tolma festival, always at a site that has historical significance in its conflicts with Azerbaijan.

Feta 
Until 1999, feta was used only by Greek producers. During the 1990s, Denmark and Germany challenged the labelling, arguing that the word 'feta' was Italian and that other EU countries shared climate and geography with parts of Greece and should be permitted to label their feta-style cheeses as Feta. In 2002 the European Union granted the sole rights to use the name to Greece.

Foie gras 
Foie gras has been protected as a name and signifier of traditional identity by France; conflict is common with animal rights activists.

Hainanese chicken rice 
Hainanese chicken rice is a dish that is often associated with Singapore, being one of its national dishes. During the 19th and 20th century, a significant amount of Hainanese people decided to move south, particularly to Singapore. Many also brought along their culinary expertise, creating numerous dishes that are a fusion of both their cuisine back in Hainan along with local ingredients available, or inventing a new dish entirely. It is often considered "one of the most beloved culinary exports of Singapore".

The dish came into fruition around the 1920s by a Hainanese chef named Wang Yiyuan who was living in Singapore. It then started to gain popularity in the mid 20th century by a chef named Moh Lee Twee, another Singaporean of Hainanese descent, whose Swee Kee Chicken Rice Restaurant operated at Middle Road for five decades.

Nevertheless, this has been sporadically disputed by Malaysia, with no substantiated counter-claims. This dispute dates back to 1965, when the two countries split; specifically when Malaysia kicked Singapore out. As the two countries were briefly formerly one, there are often disputing claims of its origin and accusations of national cuisines being misappropriated.

Harissa 
Harissa is claimed by both Armenia and Turkey, where it is called keshkek. Keshkek was recognized by UNESCO on its intangible cultural heritage list, which has caused passionate debate, with Armenians arguing that the dish's main ingredient, wheat, indicates it could not have been developed in Turkey, where the tradition was nomadic.

Hummus 
Hummus is argued over by Israel, Palestine, and Lebanon. The disagreement is sometimes referred to as the "hummus wars". The hummus wars also refers to the creation by Sabra, a US food company, of "the world's largest hummus plate" as a marketing event. Israeli company Osem responded with a larger hummus plate, and soon was followed by a group of Lebanese chefs working with the Association of Lebanese Industrialists's campaign "Hands Off Our Dishes", which claimed hummus as Lebanese and objected to the marketing of the dish as Israeli. Fadi Abboud, then president of ALI and later tourism minister for the country, threatened legal action against Israel for marketing hummus and other commercial food products as Israeli. A series of record-breaking hummus plates followed from various middle eastern countries. Abboud characterized the hummus wars as being not about just hummus but about "the organized theft carried out by Israel" in connection to the culture of the entire Arab region.

Kimchi 
Both South Korea and North Korea claim kimchi. North Korea argues that South Korea's decreasing consumption (and increasing commercialization of production) is proof that the dish is more strongly associated with North Korea. Traditional kimchi-making in South Korea in 2013 was given Intangible Cultural Heritage status by UNESCO and in 2015 in North Korea.

Japan also has interested itself in kimchi, arguing with South Korea over the Codex Alimentarius Commission's (CAC) international standardization of the dish, a disagreement often called the kimchi war.  Japan produced and exported an instant version of kimchi, which South Korea argued should not be called kimchi due to the lack of fermentation. During the 1996 Atlanta Olympics, Japan proposed making kimuchi, the Japanese name of the dish, an official food of the Olympics. In 2001 the CAC adopted an international standard which requires fermentation in order for a product to be exported as kimchi. China has also marketed kimchi; South Korea has called out as appropriation both the Japanese and Chinese marketing of the dish.

Lavash 
Lavash is claimed by Armenia, Azerbaijan and Turkey; the Armenians argue that lavash is traditionally prepared in a tonir, which indicates development in a non-nomadic society such as Armenia. Accusations in Armenian media centered around Turkey and Azerbaijan claiming the dish because they wanted to conceal their early nomadic lifestyle.

Tortillas 
During Mexico's tortilla riots, protesters chanted, "tortillas si, pan no!", expressing their nationalistic objection to replacing tortillas, with which they identified on a nationalistic level, with bread, which they saw as a colonialist introduction.

Turkish coffee 
UNESCO has included Turkish coffee in its list of items of Intangible Cultural Heritage. The style of coffee is also claimed by Greece.

Washoku 
Washoku, a "traditional food culture of the Japanese, was in 2013 added to the UNESCO Intangible Cultural Heritage List and in 2017 described by Leiden University's Katarzyna J. Cwiertka as "a myth fabricated for the purpose of Japanese nation-branding". According to Ichijo and Ranta, Japan's efforts to promote Japanese cuisine in other countries is "regarded as a way of increasing export of Japanese agricultural produce and attracting more tourists".

See also 
 Gastrodiplomacy
Gastrotourism

References 

Politics
Sociological theories
Nationalism
Food and drink